Roberto Lucero (born 24 November 1966) is an Argentine biathlete. He competed in the men's 20 km individual event at the 1992 Winter Olympics.

References

External links
 

1966 births
Living people
Argentine male biathletes
Olympic biathletes of Argentina
Biathletes at the 1992 Winter Olympics
Place of birth missing (living people)